The Adoration of the Sacrament (1523) is Martin Luther's treatise, written to Bohemian Brethren to defend the adoration of the body and blood of Christ in the Eucharist.

Original German text
Vom Anbeten des Sakraments des heiligen leichnams Christi. Luthers Werk: Weimarer Ausgabe, vol. 11, pp. 417–456

English translation
The Adoration of the Sacrament. Luther's Works: American Edition, vol. 36, pp. 268–305  

1523 books
16th-century Christian texts
Lutheran Eucharistic theology
Works by Martin Luther